is a Japanese mystery novel series written by Shiori Ōta, with illustrations by Tetsuo. Kadokawa Shoten has published seventeen volumes since 2013 under their Kadokawa Bunko label, with over 1 million copies in print. The final volume in the series was released in March 2021. An anime television series adaptation by Troyca aired in Japan between October and December 2015. A live-action television series adaptation aired between April 23 and June 25, 2017 on Fuji TV.

Plot
Sakurako Kujō is a genius beauty in her mid-twenties whose life is centered around one thing and one thing only: bones. With little tolerance for others, she would be completely isolated in her study full of skeletons if it weren't for high school boy Shotaro—her new assistant and constant companion. Why exactly she has taken a shine to him remains a mystery, but one thing is clear: Whenever the two go out together, the chances are high that they will come across a human corpse.

Characters

 (radio drama), Shizuka Itō (anime)
Played by: Alisa Mizuki
She is a beautiful woman who comes from a prominent family and lives in a big old house with only a housekeeper as a companion. She has a hobby of collecting the bones of dead animals and reconstructing them. However, she is more interested in human remains. And with her being an osteologist, she also developed forensic skills from her uncle, a prominent forensic scientist in the prefecture, and has helped with many unsolved murders. She has a dislike for interpersonal relationships, although she has a fiance working with the Hokkaido Prefectural Police. She would often refer to Shōtarō as "shōnen" ("boy") instead of his real name.

 (radio drama), Junya Enoki (anime)
Played by: Taisuke Fujigaya
He is a high school boy who assists Sakurako in her bone-digging expeditions. It so happens that they always find human remains in the process. He keeps Sakurako in check, as she tends to go crazy and try to keep the human remains for herself.

 (anime)
Shōtarō's classmate who keeps becoming entwined with his cases by coincidence.

 
 (anime)
Played by: Machiko Washio
Sakurako's caretaker, who is kind-hearted but also strict, particularly when it comes to Sakurako's love of sweets.

 (anime)
Played by: Takaya Kamikawa
A life science teacher at Shōtarō's school. He is handsome and slightly arrogant though he does care for his students.

Naoe is Sakurako's fiance who works as a police officer, and vouches for her when she works on a case.

 (anime)
Utsumi is a police officer who often helps Sakurako and Shōtarō on cases.

A dog previously owned by a family Sakurako helped. After said family moved into an apartment they gave Hector to Sakurako. Hector consistently exhibits a powerful interest and excitement toward corpses, seeking them out and staying near them when he finds them, and getting as excited as Sakurako when new skeletons arrive.

 (anime)
A classmate and friend of Shōtarō's.

 (anime)
Sakurako's aunt who is a florist. 

 (anime)
A professional painter. He is the mastermind behind many of the homicides that Sakurako investigates.

Media

Anime
An anime adaptation by Troyca aired in Japan between October 7, 2015 and December 23, 2015 and was simulcast by Crunchyroll. Yuki Ootake. Sentai Filmworks licensed the series for home video release in North America.

Episode list

Live-action series
A live-action television series adaptation of the manga series was announced on February 24, 2017. The series was co-directed by Yūichi Satō and Daisuke Yamauchi, and written by Junpei Yamaoka, with music composed by Yugo Kanno. It premiered on Fuji TV on April 23, 2017, airing every Sunday at 9:00pm for 10 episodes.

References

External links
 

2013 Japanese novels
2017 Japanese television series debuts
2017 Japanese television series endings
Anime and manga set in Hokkaido
Fuji TV dramas
Japanese mystery novels
Kadokawa Dwango franchises
Kadokawa Shoten manga
Mystery anime and manga
Mystery television series
Seinen manga
Sentai Filmworks
Tokyo MX original programming
Troyca